Calvin Britain (December 31, 1800 – January 18, 1862) was an American politician who served as the eighth lieutenant governor of Michigan.

Biography
Britain was born in Jefferson County, New York. Britain came from New York to Michigan in 1827 and for a time was a teacher at the Carey Mission at Niles, Michigan.

Career
In 1829 Britain and Augustus Newell acquired the lands on which the business portion of St. Joseph was later built. Newell built the first hotel in 1831 known as the "Mansion House". The government surveyed the land in 1830, and Britain laid out the plat of the village in 1831 calling it Newburyport.  Britain also built a warehouse and bought and sold real estate. The name of the town was changed to St. Joseph in 1834.

As a Democrat, Britain was a member of the Legislative Council of Michigan Territory from 1832 to 1835, Michigan Senate from 1835 to 1837, Michigan House of Representatives from 1847 to 1851, and member of the Constitutional Convention of 1850.  Due to changes to the Michigan Constitution adopted at that convention, he was elected to a one-year term as lieutenant governor with Governor Robert McClelland.

Death and legacy
Britain never married and resided in St. Joseph until his death there in 1862.  He is interred at Saint Joseph City Cemetery, St. Joseph, Michigan.

Calvin Township in Cass County, Michigan, is named for him.

References

External links
 olitical Graveyard

 

1800 births
1862 deaths
Lieutenant Governors of Michigan
Burials in Michigan
Democratic Party Michigan state senators
Democratic Party members of the Michigan House of Representatives
Members of the Michigan Territorial Legislature
19th-century American politicians